Barajevo is a municipality of the city of Belgrade. According to the 2011 census results, the municipality has a population of 27,110 inhabitants.

The municipality is located in the lower northern part of Šumadija, southeast of the Belgrade, with an elevation spanning from 140 meters to 364 meters. Most of the municipal territory belongs to the drainage area of the Turija river, right tributary of the Peštan river, which in turn flows into the Kolubara, thus whole area geographically gravitates to the Kolubara region. The cultural festival, "Barlet" (Barajevo summer) is held annually in Barajevo.

History
Barajevo got the status of municipality in 1956 and immediately became administratively part of the wider Belgrade area. In 1957, a nearby municipality of Beljina was annexed to Barajevo, and in 1960 Umka municipality has been divided between Čukarica and Barajevo (villages of Meljak and Vranić).

The settlement of Barajevo is still statistically classified as a rural settlement. Its population is growing by even higher rate than the municipality as a whole. It is located east of the 'Parcanski vis' hill, northern part of the Kosmaj mountain, in the valley of the Beljanica river (or Barajevska reka; Cyrillic: Бељаница or Барајевска река), a tributary to the Turija river.

Many outer settlements and hamlets are built as Barajevo grows and stretches in all directions making one continuous built-up are with the neighboring settlements (Guncati, Baćevac, Lisović, Boždarevac, Guberevac in Sopot municipality): Bela Reka, Dražanovac, Dubrave, Gaj (a separate local community with a population of 1,930 in 2002), Glumčevo Brdo (a separate local community, split after the 2002 census), Karaula, Nenadovac, Pajšuma, Ravni Gaj, Srednji Kraj, Stara Lipovica, Suva Šuma, Trebež (the industrial zone), Vitkovica.

Settlements 
The municipality of Barajevo covers an area of 213 km² and includes 13 settlements, all of which are statistically classified as rural and not urban, including the settlement of Barajevo:

It also includes various sub-settlements and hamlets spawning around the central settlements:

Demographics

According to the 2011 census results, the municipality of Barajevo has a population of 27,110 inhabitants.

Ethnic groups
The ethnic composition of the municipality:

Economy
The economy of the municipality is not much developed. Being an agricultural area, Barajevo has a mill, large orchard farm, a veterinarian station and the hunting & forestry company of Lipovička šuma. Wheat, barley, oats and corn are being grown. Industry is based on the small construction and electronic companies and the ball bearing factory.

Two major traffic routes, the Ibar Highway and the railway Belgrade-Bar (Montenegro), are passing through the municipal territory. The settlement itself was further away, but as it grew, it reached the railway.

There are two game hunting grounds in the municipality: "Lipovička Šuma", which extends into the municipality of Čukarica, and "Barajevska Reka".

One of only three officially designated campsites in Belgrade by 2018 is located in the municipality, in the village of Baćevac. It is situated within the complex of the ethno-household "Zornić's House".

The following table gives a preview of total number of registered people employed in legal entities per their core activity (as of 2018):

Duboki Potok lake
The artificial lake "Duboki Potok" (Дубоки поток; Deep brook) is located near Barajevo, with the large weekend-settlement, and is colloquially called the "Barajevo Sea". It was created in the early 1990s when the brook of the same name was dammed, so as one of his tributaries. One side of the lake is surrounded by the thick forest and other by the meadows. There are several water wells around the lake, remnants from the period when the dam was constructed.

Shores are not urbanized, but there are kafana, splav and a kayaking club on the shore. The club has rich collection of artistic paintings and sculptures donated by the artists from Serbia. One of the exhibits is the kayak which was used by Matija Ljubek and Mirko Nišović when they won a gold medal at the 1984 Summer Olympics in Los Angeles. Sports fishing is developed as the lake is populated with a variety of fish: common bream, common roach, Prussian carp, common rudd, common carp, zander, northern pike, wels catfish and grass carp. The water is apparently very clean, as the lake is also inhabited by crayfish and freshwater bivalves. There is an underwater spring in the lake.

As the splav was located at the starting point of the dam's spillway, there was a danger it might block it, so it was removed from the water in the late 2010s. Municipality made planes to arrange several sports fields around the lake, including volleyball and five-a-side football.

Politics
Recent presidents of the municipality:
 2000 – 9 February 2001; Zoran Jevtić (1947)
 9 February 2001 – 1 November 2001; Miodrag Skoknić (1931) (acting)
 1 November 2001 – 20 February 2003; Dragoljub Stanić (1947) (acting)
 20 February 2003 – 12 February 2007; Rade Stevanović (1956)
 12 February 2007 – 21 February 2007; Branislav Đurić (1957) (acting)
 21 February 2007 – 1 May 2007; Rade Stevanović (second time)
 1 May 2007 – 25 June 2007; Igor Jevtić (1975) (acting)
 25 June 2007 – 16 September 2015; Branka Savić (1956)
 16 September 2015 – 3 December 2015; Velibor Novićević (1977)
 3 December 2015 – 15 June 2016; Saša Kostić
 15 June 2016 – present; Slobodan Adamović (1967) (SNS)

Trivia
First mention of the name Barajevo is from the 16th century. The popular story that the settlement got its name from the multitude of springs in this area [Serbian: bara je ovo (this is a pond)] is probably not true.

Also, the reality TV show The Farm is captured in the village of Lisović.

See also
 Subdivisions of Belgrade
 List of Belgrade neighborhoods and suburbs

References

Sources
 Mala Prosvetina Enciklopedija, Third edition (1985); Prosveta; 
 Jovan Đ. Marković (1990): Enciklopedijski geografski leksikon Jugoslavije; Svjetlost-Sarajevo; 
 Srpska porodična enciklopedija, Vol. II (2006); Narodna knjiga and Politika NM;

External links

 

 
Municipalities of Belgrade
Suburbs of Belgrade